Caprice Art Gallery is a contemporary art gallery established on November 2012 in Tel Aviv, Israel. The gallery was originally located in Beit Eshel, Jaffa and managed by sisters Alexandra and Anna Lewin. In April 2014, it relocated to Frishman 42, Tel-Aviv. It presents work from both established and emerging artists and focuses on the use of art as a medium of cultural exchange. Caprice Art Gallery is currently owned and managed by Alexandra Lewin; Dorielle Lonke is the head of sales and exhibitions.

The gallery’s maiden exhibition was titled “From Tehran to Tel-Aviv: Fragmented Reflections”. This exhibition featured photographs by Iranian artists alongside Israeli interpretations thereof. The Iranian photographers were asked to capture images of people, moments or places that provided a glimpse into their world; Israelis then produced artistic interpretations of these pictures that were displayed alongside the original photographs. Subsequent exhibitions include “Sticks and Stones”, featuring the gouache paintings of Daphna Alon, and “Live Writing”, presenting the observational paintings of Larissa Miller. In May 2016, it presented the exhibition "From Holocaust to Revival and Creation", by Heddy Kun.

References

2012 establishments in Israel
Art galleries established in 2012
Contemporary art galleries in Israel
Buildings and structures in Tel Aviv
Culture in Tel Aviv
Tourist attractions in Tel Aviv